Konstantin Dzhelepov (born 21 April 1950) is a Bulgarian fencer. He competed in the individual and team sabre events at the 1976 Summer Olympics.

References

1950 births
Living people
Olympic fencers of Bulgaria
Fencers at the 1976 Summer Olympics
Bulgarian male sabre fencers